Insignificant Things is a 2008 Mexican drama film directed by Andrea Martínez and produced by Guillermo del Toro.

Cast
Bárbara Mori	... 	Paola
Paulina Gaitán	... 	Esmeralda
Carmelo Gómez	... 	Iván
Blanca Guerra	... 	Mara
Lucía Jiménez	... 	Eli
Fernando Luján	... 	Augusto Gabrieli
Arturo Ríos	... 	Tomás

External links
 

2008 films
Mexican drama films
2000s Spanish-language films
2008 drama films
Films produced by Guillermo del Toro
2000s Mexican films